Certified is the debut album released by hip hop group Unladylike. It was released on June 2, 2009, on Def Jam Recordings and peaked at 76 on the Top R&B/Hip-Hop Albums. The album's first single was “D'ough.” The second single released was “Bartender.”

Track listing
"D'ough" (Baker, Thomas, Nick Kage) - 3:33  
"Bartender" (Baker, Barnett, Fyffe, Thomas, Williams) - 3:28  
"Sit Down" (featuring Lil Jon) (Baker, Lamar Edwards, Glaze, Prince, Richardson, Thomas) - 3:34  
"Certified" (Baker, Thomas, Webb) - 3:27  
"Hey" (Baker, Barnett, Perry, Thomas) - 4:32  
"Like Me" (Baker, Thomas, Webb) - 3:10  
"Let It Bang" (Baker, Barnett, Thomas) - 4:10  
"Old You" (Baker, Conner, Conner, Covington, Jackson, Thomas) - 4:06  
"Go 2 Work" (Baker, Thomas) - 3:08  
"Show Um Off" (Baker, Thomas) - 3:14  
"Spazin Out" (Baker, Thomas) - 3:30  
"Papi Ova Derr" (Baker, Thomas) - 3:27

Personnel 

3*D – producer
Ashaunna Ayars – marketing
Tom Coyne – mastering
Rodney Dean – vocals
Raleigh Dunn – keyboards
Kovon Flowers – vocals
Ty Fyffe – producer
Javon Greene – A&R
Alex Haldi – art direction, design
Chris Homenick – engineer
Brandon O. Lewis – A&R
Butch Lewis – executive producer
Deborah Mannis-Gardner – sample clearance
Hannibal Matthews – photography
Steve McGuire – keyboards
Ashaki Meyers – stylist
Joe Pedulla – engineer
Manny Pérez – producer
Lenny S. – A&R
Lenny Santiago – A&R
Sinister – producer
Supa Engineer "Duro" – mixing
Ross Vanderslice – engineer
Micquel Dixon - A&R
Jordan "DJ Swivel" Young – mixing

2009 debut albums
Def Jam Recordings albums